Mermaids is a British charity and advocacy organisation that supports gender variant and transgender youth. It also provides inclusion and diversity training. Mermaids was founded in 1995 by a group of parents of gender nonconforming children and became a charitable incorporated organisation in 2015.

History

Formation and leadership 
Mermaids was founded in 1995 by a group of parents of gender nonconforming children, originally acting as a small helpline. It aims to provide support for transgender youths up to 20 years of age. Mermaids became a Charitable incorporated organisation in 2015.

Susie Green was the chief executive from January 2016 until 25 November 2022 when she resigned.  Previously she worked as an IT manager at the Citizens Advice Bureau in Leeds. Green was a trustee of Mermaids for four years from 2011. Her daughter is one of the youngest individuals in the UK to have transitioned surgically.

Lauren Stoner is interim chief executive since December 2022.

Lobbying the Tavistock Gender Identity Development Service 
In the years from 2000, Mermaids alongside another campaign group, GIRES (Gender Identity Research and Education Society), lobbied clinicians at the NHS Gender Identity Development Service (GIDS) for early interventions on children. After taking her child to Boston in 2007 to receive puberty blockers, Susie Green worked to make them available in Britain from GIDS. In response, GIDS began prescribing blockers from 2011 onwards, making them widely available in response to demand from families. Clinical psychologist Kirsty Entwistle, on the GIDS staff from 2017, said: "Those who'd connected with Mermaids were terrified, because they'd been told that their child was going to kill themselves if they didn't get blockers." GIDS describes suicide as "extremely rare".

In July 2022, NHS England decided to close GIDS and replace it with regional healthcare centres, following the publication of the independent Cass Review. In response to the decision, Mermaids CEO Susie Green was "cautiously optimistic", but expressed concerns that priority would be given to mental health over medical care. She said: "We would not want any further barriers to be put in place in terms of access to medical intervention."

Harassment of staff 
In 2017, Mermaids reported that it and its volunteers had been the victims of online harassment. CEO Green stated that she had been falsely accused of forcibly castrating her transgender daughter, Jackie. Her daughter maintained that "If my mum had not helped me, I would not be here today" and transgender journalist Paris Lees wrote: "Susie Green is saving lives and I wish my parents had known about Mermaids when I was growing up". Green raised concerns "that the social media backlash may put people off coming to the charity for help."

National Lottery funding 
In December 2018, the charity was designated £500,000 in funding by the Big Lottery Fund, to create a national network of local groups. However, the funding was put under review after criticism of the charity, including by anti-trans activist Graham Linehan, who created a post on Mumsnet calling for members of the forum to email their concerns to the National Lottery. In response to this, on 18 January 2019, YouTuber Hbomberguy began a livestream attempting to 101% complete the video game Donkey Kong 64, with a goal of $500 to be donated to Mermaids. The stream became popular and raised over $350,000 USD for Mermaids. Among other guests, the stream featured an appearance by American politician Alexandria Ocasio-Cortez. On 19 February 2019, the National Lottery concluded its review into the charity and announced that it would follow through with the promised donation, stating that "did not find any grounds to withhold the grant.". However, in October 2022, National Lottery funding was paused due to the investigation by the Charity Commission.

Media 
The 2018 ITV drama series Butterfly, about a young transgender girl, was substantially informed by Mermaids and its CEO, Susie Green, a consultant on the series who worked with creator Tony Marchant. Marchant and cast members Emmett J. Scanlan and Anna Friel also met families involved with Mermaids to inform their creative processes.

In July 2020, the charity complained that the BBC had no longer included links to themselves on BBC LGBT advice pages, alongside two other organisations. The BBC said that Mermaids was removed after complaints were made about the information it provided, and for impartiality reasons.

Data breach 
In June 2019, The Times revealed that they had discovered a data breach by Mermaids in which confidential emails had been made readily available through their website. The Times stated that these included names of transgender children and their parents, together with contact details and intimate medical information. The newspaper reported that there were internal emails from the trustees that criticised the leadership by Susie Green, as well as criticism from parents. Mermaids issued a press release on the same day, which acknowledged that a data breach had occurred, and that they had informed the Information Commissioner's Office and had corrected the breach. The press release stated that the breach was limited to internal emails and that no emails to and from families were part of the information leaked; The Times disputed this. After an investigation, Mermaids were required to pay a £25,000 fine.

Training 

Writing in The Daily Telegraph in September 2020, Kim Thomas said that some pressure groups, including Safe Schools Alliance and Transgender Trend, have argued that some resources used by Mermaids in training sessions reinforce rigid gender roles and might cause non-conforming children to identify as transgender. In contrast, Attitude quoted Kate Lister, who said that the resource is "a visual representation of gender identifying markers... At no point does anyone suggest children who act in ways that do not conform to a gender are trans. At no point does anyone suggest gay children are trans." Likewise, Mermaids released a statement saying that they have never encouraged teachers "to state that 'tomboys' should be transgender", and that they do not provide classroom talks or lesson materials for schools, contrary to what had been reported in some newspapers.

Following the commencement of the regulatory compliance case by the Charity Commission in 2022, the Department for Education has removed Mermaids from its mental health and wellbeing resources for schools.

Government policy 
The charity criticised the UK Government's April 2021 decision to disband the LGBT advisory board without a planned replacement, describing the move as "very concerning".

Challenge to LGB Alliance charitable status 

In June 2021, Mermaids along with other charities including Stonewall began raising funds to appeal the awarding of charitable status to LGB Alliance, describing the latter group's activities as "denigrating trans people". In September 2022, the case began, which is the first time in the UK one charity has attempted to strip the status of another.

Conference at Great Ormond Street Hospital 
In March 2022, Susie Green was due to speak on a panel regarding support for transgender youth, alongside Stephanie Davies-Arai, of Transgender Trend, a "gender-critical" website. The panel would have been part of an event, eventually postponed, for an expected 100 to 150 trainee child psychiatrists organised by Great Ormond Street Hospital and Health Education England. Paediatrician Hilary Cass, journalist Helen Joyce, psychotherapist Stella O'Malley, and academic Lisa Littman would also have participated.

Following complaints to the organisers by Mermaids and a trainee doctor, Davies-Arai's appearance was cancelled. Susie Green said that Mermaids "cannot be a part of a conference that gives a platform to Transgender Trend" and advised the organisers to "stay clear of anyone involved with anti-trans pseudo-medical platforms that have been set up with the sole intention of attacking trans people (especially trans youth) and their healthcare." Davies-Arai said that it "should concern everyone that the NHS has allowed unsubstantiated claims of 'transphobia' to influence their decisions."

Standards of Care for Transgender and Gender Diverse People 
In September 2022, Susie Green co-authored the 8th edition of the standards of care issued by the World Professional Association for Transgender Health.

The Daily Telegraph investigation 
In September 2022, Mermaids was the subject of an investigation by The Daily Telegraph, which accused the charity of offering chest binders to transgender youth without parental consent and to have told users they believed to be as young as 13 that hormone-blocking drugs are "totally reversible". The investigation relied largely on an anonymous adult pretending to be a 14-year-old named "Kai" in order to access services from Mermaids. Kai exchanged emails with the charity, during which the charity staff agreed to offer them a chest binder. The Daily Telegraph criticized the charity for not investigating Kai's mental health and for not requiring that Kai inform an adult, despite Kai describing their parents as unaccepting in the email exchanges. Mermaids responded by saying that they take "a harm reduction position with the understanding that providing a young person with a binder and comprehensive safety guidelines from an experienced member of staff is preferable to the likely alternative of unsafe practices and/or continued or increasing dysphoria".

Charity Commission Inquiry 
On 29 September 2022 the Charity Commission opened a regulatory compliance case into Mermaids, based on complaints made about the charity as a result of The Daily Telegraph's investigation. Mermaids subsequently submitted a number of serious incidents reports to the commission in relation to issues raised in the media, and also closed its helpline temporarily due to what it described as "intolerable abuse" received by staff and volunteers. Funding from the National Lottery has been paused during this investigation.

On 2 December 2022 it was announced that the Charity Commission had opened a statutory inquiry on 28 November and that the charity's management and governance were now being looked at. This followed the resignation of CEO Susie Green, in November 2022.

Resignation of trustee 
In October 2022, Dr Jacob Breslow of the London School of Economics resigned as a trustee of Mermaids after it was revealed that he had spoken at a conference organised by B4U-ACT, a paedophile support group, as a PhD student in 2011. In a statement, Mermaids described the organisation as "completely at odds" with its values, and said that "Once notified we took swift and decisive action to investigate... Safeguarding is of the utmost importance to Mermaids and the safety of the young people we support is our highest priority." Belinda Bell, the chair of trustees, apologised for the distress caused by the news of Breslow's links to the group, and said that he should never have been appointed to the board.

On 12 October 2022, Miriam Cates MP used Prime Minister's Questions to ask for a police investigation into Mermaids. In response, the charity said that her "attitudes to LGBT organisations are well-documented and this is not the first time she has criticised Mermaids".

References

External links
 

1995 establishments in the United Kingdom
Crisis hotlines
LGBT charities
LGBT health organizations
LGBT political advocacy groups in the United Kingdom
Organizations established in 1995
Health charities in the United Kingdom
Transgender organisations in the United Kingdom
LGBT youth organisations based in the United Kingdom